Chanel Harris-Tavita (born 3 April 1999) is a Samoan international rugby league footballer who plays as a  or .

He previously played for the New Zealand Warriors in the NRL.

Background
Harris-Tavita was born in Auckland, New Zealand and is of Maori and Samoan descent. His grandfather Ray Harris represented New Zealand Maori and Auckland.

Playing career

2016-2018
A clever ball player, he was named the New Zealand Warriors 2017 NYC player of the year.

Harris-Tavita made his NYC debut on his 17th birthday in 2016 and, after two seasons in the under-20 grade, was moved up to develop his game in the Intrust Super Premiership in 2018.

2019-2020
In round 4 of the 2019 NRL season, Harris-Tavita made his NRL debut against the Gold Coast Titans. He was viewed as Shaun Johnson long term replacement, who signed with the Cronulla-Sutherland Sharks in late 2018.

He made 13 appearances for the New Zealand Warriors in both of the 2019 and 2020 seasons as the club missed out on the finals.

2021
In round 9 of the 2021 NRL season, he scored two tries in a 38-32 loss against Manly-Warringah. 
He made a total of 11 appearances for the club which saw New Zealand once again miss out on the finals.

2022
Following New Zealand's record 70-10 loss to Melbourne in round 8 of the 2022 NRL season, it was revealed that Harris-Tavita suffered a ruptured testicle during the game which required surgery.  Harris-Tavita was then ruled out from playing indefinitely. In May 2022, Harris-Tavita announced he was taking a hiatus from rugby league at the end of the season. Harris-Tavita cited that he had lost the passion for playing the game and was going to spend his time traveling and writing.

In October Harris-Tavita was named in the Samoa squad for the 2021 Rugby League World Cup.
Harris-Tavita played for Samoa in their Rugby League World Cup final loss to Australia. During the second half, Harris-Tavita was knocked out after being hit in the head by Australia's Angus Crichton. Harris-Tavita played no further part in the match.

References

External links

New Zealand Warriors profile
Samoa profile

1999 births
Living people
New Zealand Māori rugby league players
New Zealand sportspeople of Samoan descent
Samoa national rugby league team players
New Zealand Warriors players
Rugby league players from Auckland
Rugby league halfbacks